Anne Kennedy (born 1959 Wellington, New Zealand) is a New Zealand novelist, poet, and filmwriter.

Background
Educated in Wellington, Kennedy was a piano teacher and music librarian in her early years. She graduated with a Bachelor of Music in Composition from Victoria University of Wellington and taught at Trinity College London. In 2007 she completed a Master of Arts at Victoria University of Wellington, under the supervision of Lydia Wevers, titled Kicking round home: Atonality in the Bone People.

Career
Since 1986, she has been a freelance scriptwriter. Anne Kennedy published her first novel in 1988, and has since published six novels and books of poetry. Her most recent novel, The Last Days of the National Costume, was featured on the Listener's Top 100 Books of 2013, and on the Nielson 2013 Bestseller's list in New Zealand adult fiction.

In 2006, Kennedy was a visiting writer at University of Hawaiʻi at Mānoa. She was a professor there for several years. Currently, she teaches creative writing at Manukau Institute of Technology. She is currently co-editor of literary journal Ika, and was co-editor of the online literary journal Trout
 and co-edited the  2005 Best New Zealand Poems series.

Her work has appeared in Landfall, Sport, NZ Listener, Southerly (Australia), and JAAM, and she has co-edited several other works including the 2005 Best New Zealand Poems series.

In 2021 she received the Prime Minister's Award for Literary Achievement in Poetry.

Awards
1985 Bank of New Zealand Katherine Mansfield Short Story Award
1995 University of Auckland Literary Fellow
2004 Montana New Zealand Book Award for Poetry
2013 New Zealand Post Book Awards - Poetry category winner
2014 Fellowship for University of Auckland Residency at the Michael King Writers' Centre
2014 Nigel Cox Unity Books Award
2021 Prime Minister's Award for Literary Achievement

Works

Poetry
The Sea Walks into a Wall, 2021 
Moth Hour, Auckland University Press, 2019 
"What Fell"; "Towards Fourteen Ways of Looking at Pohutukawa"; "Berlin", Poetry New Zealand
"I am", Scottish Poetry Library

Novels
The Last Days of the National Costume Allen & Unwin 2013

Screenwriting
The Monkey's Mask

Essay
The Source of the Song (ed. Mark Williams, 1995)

Anthologies

 1st edition 1992

References

External links
"Anne Kennedy", New Zealand Book Council
"Anne Kennedy", The New Word
"Kirsty Gunn introduces Anne Kennedy ", Scottish Poetry Library
Allen & Unwin - Author Display

1959 births
Living people
20th-century New Zealand poets
20th-century New Zealand novelists
20th-century screenwriters
20th-century New Zealand women writers
21st-century New Zealand poets
21st-century New Zealand novelists
21st-century New Zealand women writers
New Zealand women novelists
New Zealand women poets
Victoria University of Wellington alumni
University of Hawaiʻi faculty
New Zealand screenwriters
New Zealand women screenwriters
Writers from Wellington City